Thomensis is Latin for "of Thomas" or "of the island of São Tomé". It may refer to several species found on the island and in the surrounding waters:

Acantuerta thomensis, a moth species found in the island of São Tomé, São Tomé and Príncipe
Agathodes thomensis, a moth species found in the island of São Tomé, São Tomé and Príncipe
Andrena thomensis, a mining bee species
Angraecopsis thomensis, an orchid species
Asura thomensis, a moth species found in the island of São Tomé, São Tomé and Príncipe
Bangalaia thomensis, a beetle species found on the island of São Tomé, São Tomé and Príncipe
Castianeira thomensis, a spider species
Columba thomensis, São Tomé olive pigeon, a pigeon species found in São Tomé and Príncipe
Conosia thomensis, a crane fly species found in the island of São Tomé, São Tomé and Príncipe
Dreptes thomensis, Giant sunbird, a bird species found in the island of São Tomè, São Tomé and Príncipe
Diaphananthe thomensis, an orchid species found in the island of São Tomé, São Tomé and Príncipe
Dichromia thomensis, a moth species
Disparctia thomensis, a moth species found in the island of São Tomé, São Tomé and Príncipe
Eunidia thomensis, a beetle species found on the island of São Tomé, São Tomé and Príncipe
Estrilda thomensis, the Cinderella waxbill, a finch species found in southwestern Angola and the extreme northwestern Namibia
Hipposideros thomensis, the São Tomé leaf-nosed bat, a bat species
Hyperolius thomensis, Sao Tome giant treefrog, a treefrog species found in the island of São Tomé, São Tomé and Príncipe
Lygodactylus thomensis, the Annobon dwarf gecko
Monochamus thomensis, a beetle species found on the island of São Tomé, São Tomé and Príncipe
Pandanus thomensis, a plant species found on the island of São Tomé, São Tomé and Príncipe
Pterolophia thomensis, beetle species
Philothamnus thomensis, a green snake species found in the island of São Tomé, São Tomé and Príncipe
Pradoxa thomensis, a murex snail species found on the island of São Tomé, São Tomé and Príncipe
Psychotria thomensis, a flowering plant species
Rinorea thomensis, a violet plant species found on the island of São Tomé, São Tomé and Príncipe
Ropica thomensis, a beetle species found on the island of São Tomé, São Tomé and Príncipe
Schistometopum thomense, a caecilian (cecilian) frog species founded in the island of São Tomé, São Tomé and Príncipe
Stenandriopsis thomensis, a monotypic thorn species found in the island of São Tomé, São Tomé and Príncipe
Syrnola thomensis, a pyram snail species found on the island of São Tomé, São Tomé and Príncipe
Thyrophorella thomensis, a land snail species found in the island of São Tomé, São Tomé and Príncipe
Zoonavena thomensis, São Tomé spinetail, a swift species found in the islands of São Tomé and nearby Ilhéu de Rolas, São Tomé and Príncipe

It may also refer to a subspecies:
Corythornus cristatus thomensis, the São Tomé kingfisher
Tyto alba thomensis, a subspecies of the owl Tyto alba

Synonyms
Alcedo thomensis, a synonym of Corythornus cristatus thomensis, the São Tomé kingfisher
Cerura thomensis, a synonym of Afrocerura cameroona, a moth species
Creatonotos thomensis, a synonym of Disparctia thomensis, a moth species
Crossandra thomensis, a synonym of Stenandriopsis thomensis, a thorn species
Dermophis thomensis, a synonym of Schistometopum thomense, a caecilian frog species
Nectarinia thomensis, a synonym of Dreptes thomensis, the Giant sunbird
Nephila thomensis, a synonym of Nephila clavipes
Siphonops thomensis, a synonym of Schistometopum thomense, a caecilian (cecilian) frog species

See also
Tomensis (disambiguation)
Thomae (disambiguation)
Santomensis (disambiguation)